Nackington is an English village and former civil parish, now in the parish of Lower Hardres and Nackington, south of Canterbury in the Canterbury district, in the county of Kent. The 12th century church is dedicated to St Mary. In 1931 the parish had a population of 80.

History 
On 1 April 1934 the parish of was merged into "Lower Hardres" and on 1 April 2019 the new parish was renamed to "Lower Hardres and Nackington".

References

External links

Villages in Kent
Former civil parishes in Kent
City of Canterbury